Edgar S. Prado (Lima, June 12, 1967) is a Peruvian-born American jockey, a U.S. Racing Hall of Fame jockey in thoroughbred horse racing.

His big break came in 1997 when he won 536 races, making him the fourth rider in history to win 500 races in one year. Much of that success was gained in Maryland, where he ruled that circuit for several years.

A resident of Hollywood, Florida in 2004 Prado became the 19th jockey in thoroughbred racing history to win 5,000 races.  Edgar is married to Liliana and 
has three children named Edgar Jr, Louis and Patricia. Louis works as a scribe at Joe DiMaggio Children's Hospital in Hollywood, Florida.

Career
On May 6, 2006, Prado rode Barbaro to victory in the 132nd Kentucky Derby, 6½ lengths ahead of the second finisher, Bluegrass Cat. The margin of victory was the largest since Triple Crown winner Assault won by eight lengths in 1946. Barbaro was pulled up following a horrific ankle injury during the Preakness Stakes two weeks later. Prado was visibly moved, declining comment, but by all accounts his fast action on the track contributed to saving the colt's life. (However, Barbaro was euthanized by veterinarians at the University of Pennsylvania's New Bolton Center on January 29, 2007.)

Other racing accomplishments include victories in the 2002 and 2004 Belmont Stakes, in each case aboard a longshot depriving a favorite of the United States Triple Crown. In 2002 Prado won the Belmont aboard Sarava, who is the longest shot to ever win the Belmont Stakes in its history at odds of 70¼/1. In 2004 Prado rode Birdstone to victory in the Belmont, denying heavy favorite Smarty Jones the Triple Crown. Prado and Birdstone then went on to win the prestigious Travers Stakes at the Saratoga Race Course in Saratoga Springs, New York in August 2004.

Prado had not won a Breeders' Cup race until 2005, when he won two, riding Folklore to victory in the Breeders' Cup Juvenile Fillies and Silver Train in the Breeders' Cup Sprint.

On September 24, 2006, Prado received the New York Racing Association's 2006 Mike Venezia Memorial Award in a paddock ceremony at Belmont Park. The winner of this award is decided by the votes of fellow jockeys, turf writers and an online vote by fans. It honors those "...who exemplify extraordinary sportsmanship and citizenship", and is given in memory of Mike Venezia, killed on October 13, 1988 in a spill at Belmont Park.

On February 10, 2008 at Gulfstream Park, Edgar Prado achieved his 6000th win.  Only 16 jockeys in the United States have achieved this record.  

Prado is involved with Belmont Park's "Anna House", a child day care centre providing care for the children of backstretch workers.

On August 4, 2008 he was formally inducted into the National Museum of Racing Hall of Fame.

On October 31, 2015 he rode Runhappy to Breeder's Cup Sprint victory setting a new track record.

On May 15, 2018 Prado became the 8. North American Rider to reach 7,000 wins.

On March 25, 2020, Prado tied for eighth on the all time win list with Angel Cordero, Jr with a win aboard Cory Gal in that day's third race at Gulfstream Park.

References
 Edgar Prado at the National Museum of Racing Hall of Fame
 Edgar Prado at the NTRA

Year-end charts

1967 births
Living people
American jockeys
American Champion jockeys
Eclipse Award winners
United States Thoroughbred Racing Hall of Fame inductees
Sportspeople from Lima
Peruvian jockeys
Peruvian emigrants to the United States